Al-Munaqqab is a village in Hamdan District of Sanaa Governorate, Yemen. It lies to the north of the road between Sanaa and Shibam Kawkaban, and is built on a small hill of porous volcanic rock, with some houses being built directly into the hillside. It was the site of a minor fortress during the late medieval and early modern period, and is first mentioned in historical records in 683 AH (1284 CE).

References 

Villages in Sanaa Governorate